Serge Merlin (born Serge Merle; 29 December 1932 – 16 February 2019) was a French actor. He became internationally known for his role in the film Amélie (2001), which received widespread critical acclaim.

On 9 July 2014, Merlin was made a Commander of the Order of the Arts and Letters.

Filmography

Film

References

External links
 

French male film actors
French male television actors
French male stage actors
1932 births
2019 deaths